John McLaren, Lord McLaren, FRSE (17 April 1831 – 6 April 1910) was a British Liberal politician and judge. In the scientific world he is remembered as a mathematician and astronomer.

Life
The son of Duncan McLaren, a former Provost of Edinburgh and Member of Parliament, and his wife Grant Aitken, he was born at 21 South St David Street, in Edinburgh's New Town.

He studied law at Edinburgh University. He was admitted to the Scottish Faculty of Advocates in 1856. In 1869 he was elected a Fellow of the Royal Society of Edinburgh, his proposer being Robert William Thomson. He served as the society's vice president for three sessions:
1885 to 1891; 1892 to 1898; and 1901 to 1906.

He held the office of Sheriff of Chancery in Scotland 1869–1880. He reorganised the Liberal party and arranged Gladstone's Midlothian campaign of 1879–1880.

He was elected Member of Parliament for Wigtown Burghs in April 1880 and appointed Lord Advocate, losing his seat on seeking re-election on 20 May 1880. He failed to be elected at Berwick-upon-Tweed on 21 July 1880, but was returned for Edinburgh on 28 January 1881. McLaren's father Duncan McLaren had resigned as MP for Edinburgh, which produced the vacancy to be filled. McLaren continued to sit for Edinburgh until he was appointed as a judge, later in the year. He was Lord Advocate for Scotland during 1880–81.

Under pressure from Gladstone and Sir William Harcourt, he accepted appointment to the bench in 1881 with the judicial title Lord McLaren. He was an eminently successful judge, and edited works on Scots law. For his contributions to astronomy and mathematics he was awarded honorary degrees (all LLD) from Edinburgh University, the University of Glasgow and the University of Aberdeen.

Lord McLaren died in Brighton in Sussex on 6 April 1910 but was returned to Edinburgh for burial in the Grange Cemetery on its southernmost path. The original bronze medallion head was stolen but it is replaced with an accurate and convincing plastic replica.

Publications

McLaren wrote a number of books on legal topics, including Law of Wills and Succession.

Family

In 1868 he married Ottile Schwabe (d.1914). Their children largely died in childhood. Their eldest daughter was Ottilie McLaren

Artistic recognition

His portrait by Sir John Lavery is held in the Scottish National Portrait Gallery but is seldom displayed.

References 

Source: Who's Who of British Members of Parliament, Volume I 1832-1885 edited by M. Stenton (The Harvester Press 1976).

External links 
 

1831 births
1910 deaths
Alumni of the University of Edinburgh
Scottish Liberal Party MPs
Lord Advocates
Members of the Parliament of the United Kingdom for Edinburgh constituencies
Maclaren
UK MPs 1880–1885
Scottish legal writers